Telaletes is a genus of tephritid  or fruit flies in the family Tephritidae.

Species
Telaletes obscurata Munro, 1957
Telaletes ochracea (Loew, 1861)

References

Tephritinae
Tephritidae genera
Diptera of Africa
Diptera of Asia